NGC 5144 is an unbarred spiral galaxy.

References

External links

Unbarred spiral galaxies
5144
46742
8420
Ursa Minor (constellation)